Dictyna saltona is a species of spider in the family Dictynidae. The scientific name of this species was first published in 1958 by Ralph Vary Chamberlin & Willis J. Gertsch

References

Dictynidae
Spiders of the United States
Spiders described in 1958